Stefano Tremigliozzi (born 7 May 1985 in Benevento) is an Italian long jumper.

Biography
He was the Italian champion in the long jump in 2008, with a jump of 7.85 metres. He was also the Italian indoor champion in 2009 (Ancona) and 2010 (Turin). His brother, Marco Tremigliozzi, was the Italian indoor champion in 2000.

In 2010 he established his personal best jump with 8.01 metres, which met the entry standard for the 2010 European Athletics Championships and was the 13th best European jump in 2010.

Achievements

National titles
He has won the individual national championship 6 times.
1 win in the long jump (2008)
5 wins in the long jump indoor (2009, 2010, 2013, 2014, 2016)

See also
 Long jump winners of Italian Athletics Championships

References

External links
 

1985 births
Sportspeople from Benevento
Italian male long jumpers
Living people
Athletics competitors of Centro Sportivo Aeronautica Militare
Competitors at the 2009 Summer Universiade
Athletes (track and field) at the 2009 Mediterranean Games
Mediterranean Games competitors for Italy